The swamp frog is a genus of leptodactylid frogs from South America.

Swamp frog may also refer to:

 African swamp frog, a frog found in Africa
 Australian swamp frog, a frog native to Australia, New Guinea, and some Torres Strait Islands
 Greater swamp frog, a frog found in Borneo
 Green and golden swamp frog, a frog native to eastern Australia
 Large swamp frog, a frog endemic to the Philippines
 Lesser swamp frog, a frog found in Thailand, Malaysia, and Singapore
 New England swamp frog, a frog endemic to southeastern Australia
 Peat swamp frog, a frog found in Indonesia, Malaysia, Singapore, and Thailand
 Sacred swamp wrinkled frog, a frog endemic to the Western Ghats, India
 Warty swamp frog, a frog native to Australia

Animal common name disambiguation pages